Kirk John Norcross (born 21 April 1988) is an English television personality. He was a cast member of reality series The Only Way Is Essex from 2010 to 2013, and in 2012, he participated in the ninth series of Celebrity Big Brother.

Career
In 2010, he began appearing in the television series The Only Way Is Essex before leaving the show after the third series was aired. Norcross returned to the show in the seventh series, although he departed again in series eight in March 2013. Norcross was also on the front cover of the March 2011 issue of Attitude.

In 2012, Norcross was a housemate on Celebrity Big Brother. He was evicted from the house on day 16 after receiving the fewest votes to save. In July 2012, Norcross featured in an advertising campaign with friend Jodie Marsh. On 30 September 2012, Norcross returned for the seventh series of The Only Way Is Essex, but just six months later, on 21 March 2013, he announced that he had left the show again.

Personal life
On 9 May 2013, photographs of Norcross naked and masturbating were leaked onto the internet. Norcross apologized for the images on Twitter. Norcross has admitted: "I'm probably most famous for masturbating and smoking simultaneously on the internet." 

In April 2013, Norcross released his autobiography, Essex Boy.

References

External links 

 

1988 births
Living people
People from Brentwood, Essex
People from Woodford, London
Place of birth missing (living people)
Television personalities from Essex